Outside Providence is a 1999 American teen stoner comedy film adaptation of Peter Farrelly's 1988 novel of the same name.  The film was directed by Michael Corrente, and it was written by Corrente and the brothers Peter and Bobby Farrelly. The Farrellys couldn't direct the film due to filming There's Something About Mary. Centering on Timothy "Dildo/Dunph" Dunphy, the film is about his life of mischief, his "incentive" to attend the Cornwall Academy preparatory boarding school, and his realization that the haze in which he has lived has to give way to something that will stay with him forever. The book is based on Peter Farrelly's experience at Kent School, a prep school in Kent, Connecticut.

Plot
Timothy "Dildo/Dunph" Dunphy (Shawn Hatosy), is in the Class of 1974 in his high school senior year living in Pawtucket, Rhode Island, comes from a troubled single parent working-class family, and is friends with those who have aspirations which do not exceed smoking marijuana at the water tower that has a view of the town. His father, Pat (Alec Baldwin), suffers from his wife committing suicide and appears naïve when the boys come back to the Dunphys' house to get a bong. A regularly held poker game is in progress. Pat insists that the boys be respectful and come in to say hello. The boys' intention is undetected by Pat that they are using drugs when Dunph's wheelchair-using younger brother, Jackie (Tommy Bone), attempts to hand off the bong wrapped in Dunph's coat. It falls to the floor. Jackie suggests that it is a musical horn which Pat's friend, Joey (George Wendt), asks Dunph to demonstrate, only able to make sounds about which Pat is dismissive. Pat's friends chuckle at Pat's reaction. Off the boys go on their adventures.

The guys head home with Dunph at the wheel but he is unable to see the road with the cloud of marijuana smoke filling the cab. He rear-ends a police vehicle. Pat's poker game player, Caveech, uses his influence with a local judge to replace a reform school sentence with the stipulation of parole graduating high school at Cornwall Academy, a Connecticut boys' boarding school with a sister school nearby under the same name. Failure to graduate vacates the terms of parole and he will serve a one year jail sentence.

He meets the rigid dorm master, Mr. Funderburk (Timothy Crowe), who emphases learning the school rules book. Dunph learns that new friend Wheeler and other new schoolmates, a class of people that seem to have more opportunities than himself, are involved in their own mischief just like the boys back home. Billy Fu is one particular example. He is a middle eastern exchange student with "the best reefer on campus". He routinely misses classes without repercussion because his father pledges a large donation to the school on the condition that Billy graduate.

Dunph is no longer just any student at the school when "Drugs" Delaney (Jon Abrahams), writes Dunph with his particular colorful words and addressing the letter in the most simplest of ways that the school has to open it to learn of the contents; Dunph has low regard for both the school and Mr. Funderburk. Dunph routinely gets sanctioned with work hours as punishment for his school rules transgressions. He also develops a friendship with a sister school student, Jane Weston (Amy Smart), regarded as "hands down, the coolest girl in school". A romance develops and through her advice he learns about personal fulfillment which could be achieved by an education.

She and others are found out by Mr. Funderburk smoking marijuana and drinking alcohol in a dorm room of the boys' dorm. The incident is resolved, unknown to Dunph's knowledge until too late, with Jane expelled for school rules violations. Dunph feels responsible for dashing Jane's goal of attending Brown University following graduation. He concludes: Wheeler's acceptance at Yale University is weighed heavily by a letter of recommendation from Funderburk and Wheeler was caught with marijuana during an earlier raid; therefore Wheeler made his own deal with Funderburk to inform on others which resulted in Jane being expelled. Dunph resolves to see Jane's college plans revitalized by speaking with the Dean at Brown University, as he explains that she was the innocent party in the incident.

Dunph comes to terms with his father's apprehension discussing the death in the family because the latter felt responsible for imposing on her a life that she could not handle; she being too young when they married, depressed and agoraphobic. Dunph refuses to shake Funderburk's hand at the graduation ceremony in the auditorium and exits after asking his classmates for his "luggage". He then meets up with his father and Jackie as they arrive. Pat hands over an acceptance letter from the Community College of Rhode Island where Dunph points out that everyone is accepted although he could then transfer to a "senior college...where people sleep over and shit." Pat congratulates Dunph for being the first of the family to go to college and the younger brother not to be trumped surmises the possibility that it just very well may be that Jackie himself may be the first to graduate.

Alternate ending
An alternate ending is found on the DVD, which has Dunph leaving the graduation ceremonies, meeting Jackie and Clopsy, their three-legged dog. Also showing up is Jane, whom Dunph shares a passionate kiss with, which annoys Funderburk, who wastes no time in rebuking both Dunph and Jane. Dunph responds by punching Funderburk, knocking him to the sidewalk.

Cast
 Shawn Hatosy as Timothy Dunphy
 Amy Smart as Jane Weston
 Alec Baldwin as Old Man Dunphy
 Jon Abrahams as Drugs Delaney
 Jonathan Brandis as Mousy
 Adam LaVorgna as Tommy the Wire
 Jesse Leach as Decenz
 Gabriel Mann as Jack Wheeler
 Jack Ferver as Irving Waltham
 Richard Jenkins as Barney
 Mike Cerrone as Caveech
 George Wendt as Joey
 Eric Brown as English teacher
 Timothy Crowe as Mr. Funderburk

Production 

The exterior prep school scenes were filmed at the University of Rhode Island, with interior scenes filmed in the Cranston Street Armory in the west end of Providence. The Brother Adelard Ice Hockey Arena at Mount Saint Charles Academy was used for a brief scene.

Release
USA 16 August 1999 (Warwick, Rhode Island) (premiere) 
USA 1 September 1999  
Iceland 8 October 1999  
Australia 28 October 1999  
Netherlands 28 October 1999  
Sweden 3 December 1999  
Finland: 2000 (DVD premiere). Titled: "Elämää oppimassa" 
Belgium 5 January 2000  
Norway 18 February 2000  
Argentina: 22 February 2000 (video premiere). Titled: "Lejos de Providencia".
Spain: 30 June 2000. Titled: "No puedo perderte por algo tan tonto como el sexo"  
Slovenia 24 August 2000  
Hungary: 17 October 2000 (video premiere). Titled: "Jótanácsok kamaszoknak"

Foreign release titles 
Brazil: Deixa Rolar
France: Les années lycée
Greece (TV title): Anexigiti pronoia
Greece (video title): O eparhiotis
Italy: Outside Providence
Spanish No Puedo Perderte Por Algo Tan Tonto Como El Sexo
Latin América ''Lejos De Providencia.

Reception

The film recouped costs within the first month of release, with revenue exceeding the $7 million budget by $300,000.

Rotten Tomatoes gives the film a score of 51% with an average rating of 5.6/10, based on 76 reviews. The site's consensus states: "Miscasted performers and humor miss the mark." Metacritic gives the film a score of 62 out of 100 based on reviews from 32 critics, indicating "generally favorable reviews". Audiences polled by CinemaScore gave the film an average grade of "B" on an A+ to F scale.

References

External links
 
 
 

1999 films
1990s teen comedy films
American teen comedy films
1990s English-language films
Films based on American novels
Films set in Connecticut
Films set in Rhode Island
Films set in the 1970s
Films shot in Rhode Island
Pawtucket, Rhode Island
Films set in 1974
Films with screenplays by the Farrelly brothers
1999 comedy films
Films directed by Michael Corrente
1990s American films